The Volvo B10C was a coach chassis manufactured by Volvo between 1988 and 1991. It was developed as a 3-axle version of the Volvo B10M specifically for the Australian market and came with a raked front. It sold in small numbers with purchasers including the Australian Army, Bus Australia and Peninsula Bus Lines.

References

External links
Bus Australia gallery

Vehicles introduced in 1988
B10C
Bus chassis